Jacqueline Bouette de Blémur or Marie-Jacqueline Bouette de Blémur, (8 January 1618 – 24 March 1696 in Chatillon (fr)) known under the name Mère Saint-Benoît, was a 17th-century French Benedictine nun and mystical writer.

As an historian, she wrote several works:
 L'année bénédictine, 
 Éloges de plusieurs personnes illustres en piété de l'ordre de Saint-Benoît, 
 Vies des saints, 
 Abrégé de la vie de la vénérable mère Charlotte Le Sergent, religieuse de Montmartre, etc.

References

External links 
 Dictionnaire de Fortunée Briquet on the site of the SIEFAR
 Notice nécrologique de Jacqueline Bouette de Blemur, O. S. B. du Saint Sacrement
 Jacqueline Bouette de Blémur in Histoire des religieuses

17th-century French nuns
French women writers
1618 births
1696 deaths